Arthur Conan Doyle KStJ, DL (1859–1930) was a Scottish writer and physician. In addition to the series of stories chronicling the activities of Sherlock Holmes and his friend Dr John Watson for which he is well known, Doyle wrote on a wide range of topics, both fictional and non-fictional. In 1876 Doyle entered the University of Edinburgh Medical School, where he became a pupil of Joseph Bell, whose deductive processes impressed his pupil so much that the teacher became the chief model for Holmes. Doyle began writing while still a student, and in October 1879 he had his first work—"The Mystery of the Sasassa Valley"—published in Chambers's Journal. He continued writing short works—both fictional and non-fictional—throughout his career, and had over 200 stories and articles published.

In July 1891 Doyle published the short story "A Scandal in Bohemia" in The Strand Magazine—a "story which would change his life", according to his biographer, Andrew Lycett, as it introduced Holmes and Watson to a wide audience; the duo had provided the subject of Doyle's first novel, A Study in Scarlet, which was published in Beeton's Christmas Annual in 1887. The story in The Strand was one in a series of six, published in successive months. They were well received by the public, and the editors of the magazine commissioned a further six stories, and then another series of twelve. Doyle, fearful of having his other work overshadowed by his fictional detective, killed his creation off in December 1893 in "The Adventure of the Final Problem". He also wrote four full-length Holmes works, as well as adventure novels and nine historical works of fiction. In 1912 he began the adventure series featuring Professor Challenger, who first appeared in The Lost World—both in short stories and novels.

Doyle also wrote four volumes of poetry and a series of stage works—his first was Jane Annie, an unsuccessful attempt at a libretto to an operetta, which he wrote with J. M. Barrie. Doyle was an enthusiastic supporter of the Boer War, and wrote two histories of the events. During the First World War he also wrote extensively on that conflict, both short articles and a six-volume history. Following the close successive deaths of his son and his brother, Doyle turned to spiritualism and wrote extensively on the subject; his biographer Owen Dudley Edwards writes that at the time of Doyle's death in July 1930, while the writer "most wanted to be remembered as a champion of spiritualism and as a historical novelist, it is Sherlock Holmes who has continued to capture the imagination of the public".

Publications in periodicals

Novels

Short story collections

Stage works

Poetry

The majority of Doyle's poetry falls into the genre of war poetry.

Non-fiction

Spiritualist and paranormal works

Books

Pamphlets

Notes and references

Notes

References

Sources

External links

 
 Works at Project Gutenberg Australia
 Online works available from The University of Adelaide Library 
  at Internet Archive

Bibliographies by writer
Bibliographies of British writers
Mystery fiction bibliographies